The Armenian Floorball Federation (AFF), is the regulating body of floorball in Armenia, governed by the Armenian Olympic Committee. The headquarters of the federation is located in Vanadzor.

History 
The Armenian Floorball Federation was established in 1999 and is currently led by President Sergey Sargsyan. The Federation oversees the training of floorball specialists and referees and is responsible for the development of floorball in the country. The Federation organizes Armenia's participation in European and international floorball competitions. The Federation is a member of the International Floorball Federation.

Activities 
In 2001, the Federation launched the annual Armenian Floorball Championships.

See also 
 Sport in Armenia

References

External links 
 Armenian Floorball Federation official website

Sports governing bodies in Armenia
Sports organizations established in 1999
Armenia